Major-General Sir Arthur Edward Broadbent Parsons  (1884–1966) was a British Indian Army officer and administrator in British India. He was commissioned into the Oxfordshire Volunteer Light Infantry as an acting second lieutenant in 1904, and was given a full second lieutenancy in 1906. He was promoted to lieutenant in 1909 and to captain in 1915. He was a major by 1923, in which year he was awarded the DSO to add to his OBE. He was appointed a CBE in 1927 and was knighted with the KCIE in 1938, by which time he was a lieutenant-colonel. He served as governor of the North-West Frontier Province in 1939.

References

External links
DSO citation. The London Gazette.

Administrators in British India
British Indian Army generals
Knights Commander of the Order of the Indian Empire
Commanders of the Order of the British Empire
Companions of the Distinguished Service Order
1884 births
1966 deaths
Sherwood Foresters officers
British military personnel of the Waziristan Campaign
Indian Army personnel of World War I
Indian Political Service officers